Celta Vigo contested La Liga and the Copa del Rey in the 1997–98 season. They placed 6th in La Liga, their best result since 1970–71. This qualified them for the 1998–99 UEFA Cup, which would be their first European participation for 27 years. They were eliminated in the Copa del Rey round of 16 by Real Mallorca.

Squad

Left club during season

Squad stats 
Last updated on 16 February 2021.

|-
|colspan="14"|Players who have left the club after the start of the season:

|}

Results

La Liga

League table

Position by round

Matches

Copa del Rey

Second round 

Celta Vigo won 3–1 on aggregate

Third round 

Celta Vigo won 6–2 on aggregate

Round of 16 

2–2 on aggregate. Real Mallorca won on away goals

References

External links 
Spain 1997/98 at RSSSF

RC Celta de Vigo seasons
Celta